"Freak the Freak Out" is a song by the Victorious cast featuring American actress and singer Victoria Justice from the soundtrack album Victorious: Music from the Hit TV Show (2011). It was produced by The Super Chris and Michael Corcoran, who also co-wrote the song with C.J. Abraham, Nick Hexum, Zack Hexum, and Dan Schneider. It was released as the lead single from the soundtrack on November 22, 2010, through Columbia Records and Nickelodeon. Musically, it is a teen pop track with lyrics about fighting with an uncommunicative boyfriend. A Victorious episode of the same name premiered on November 26, 2010, and features Tori Vega (Justice), Jade West (Elizabeth Gillies) and Cat Valentine (Ariana Grande) trying to expose a rigged karaoke competition.

The song was met with generally positive reviews from critics, with the majority of them praising its catchiness. "Freak the Freak Out"  peaked at number 50 on the US Billboard Hot 100, giving Justice her highest charting single on the chart. The song was certified gold in the United States by the Recording Industry Association of America (RIAA). An accompanying music video was released on November 19, 2010, and was later added to Justice's YouTube channel on September 20, 2012. The visual portrays Justice and the Victorious cast at a warehouse in Los Angeles, dancing against other people. Justice performed the song live at the 2010 Macy's Thanksgiving Day Parade.

Background and release
"Freak the Freak Out" was released as the lead single from the soundtrack album Victorious: Music from the Hit TV Show on November 22, 2010. It later appeared on the American television sitcom Victorious one-hour special of the same name on November 26, 2010. In the episode, Tori Vega (Victoria Justice) and her friends are thrilled to try out Karaoke Dokie, a fictional karaoke club that features weekly singing competitions. On the night of a competition, Jade West (Elizabeth Gillies) and Cat Valentine (Ariana Grande) team up to perform, but the club's owner tampers the competition so his daughter and her friend can win. Jade and Cat seek out Tori for her help to get revenge. Tori sings "Freak the Freak Out" while wearing a disguise consisting of a hat, wig, wart, and prosthetic nose. 

The song was written by Michael Corcoran, also known as Backhouse Mike, C.J. Abraham, Nick Hexum, Zack Hexum, Dan Schneider. It also featured addition production by Greg Wells on additional production.The mixing for the song was provided by Greg Wellstook place at Rocket Carousel in Los Angeles, California. Corcoran and the Super Chris produced the track along with providing all the instruments on the song. Corcoran also provided the guitars. Corcoran was also included on the programming for the song with CJ Abraham, both of which engineered the track in the Backhouse in Los Angeles. Corcoran and Abraham provided additional vocals along with Niki Watkins, Nick and Zack Hexum.

Music and lyrics
Writing for AllMusic, William Ruhlmann described "Freak the Freak Out" as a teen pop song. Jason Lipshutz, writing for Billboard said the song finds Justice "having a blast with the G-rated concept and flashing an undeniable amount of charisma". Bob Hoose and Steven Isaac for Plugged In compared to track to the works of American singer Katy Perry. Both critics say the track is about how "Tori blows up at an uncommunicative boyfriend": "I'm so sick of it/Your attention deficit/Never listen, you never listen/I'm so sick of it/So I'm throwing on a fit." They opined that the "second 'freak' in the title is a not-so-subtle substitute for an intended obscenity".

Reception
"Freak the Freak Out"  was met with mainly positive reviews from music critics. Lipshutz opined the song "deserves to be re-discovered as a highly campy, totally transfixing single". The staff of Tiger Beat stated the track "has such a catchy and fun beat to it. It's definitely something we need to get on our mp3 players ASAP". Megan Gaertner for Her Campus placed the song at number four on her The Best Songs from Victorious list, saying the song "is another great bop" and that it "was and still is a great one to jam out to with you besties". In a less enthusiastic review, Ruhlmann mentioned it is "typical of the genre [teen pop], with their relentless beats, synthesized instrumentations, nonstop simple, repetitive choruses, and Auto-Tune vocals".

"Freak the Freak Out" debuted at number 78 on the US Billboard Hot 100 chart dated December 18, 2010. The song later peaked at number 50 on the chart in January 2011, giving Justice her highest hit on the Hot 100. It also peaked at number six on the Billboard Kids Digital Song Sales. The Recording Industry Association of America (RIAA) certified the single a gold certification, which denotes 500,000 units based on sales and track-equivalent on-demand streams in the United States.

Promotion 

A music video for "Freak the Freak Out" was released on November 19, 2010, and was streamed on Nick.com and Nick's wireless partners. It was later uploaded to VictoriousVEVO YouTube channel on September 20, 2012. It was the first music video to be made for a Victorious song. The visual features Justice and the Victorious cast doing a dance-off with other people at a warehouse in downtown Los Angeles. Gillies, Leon Thomas III, Matt Bennett, and Avan Jogia dance to the song on the dance floor. Justice performed the song live at the 2010 Macy's Thanksgiving Day Parade in New York City. In January 2020, Grande and Bennett sang the song while staying at Disneyland.

Credits and personnel
Credits are taken from Victorious liner notes. 
Victoria Justice – vocals
Michael Corcoran - songwriting, production, instrumentation, guitars, programming, engineering, background vocals
The Super Chris - production, instrumentation
C.J. Abraham - songwriting, programming, engineering, background vocals
Nick Hexum - songwriting, background vocals
Zack Hexum - songwriting, background vocals
Dan Schneider - songwriting
Niki Watkins - background vocals
Greg Wells - additional production, mixing

Charts

Certifications

Release history

References

2010 singles
2010 songs
Columbia Records singles
Songs from television series
Songs written by Michael Corcoran (musician)
Songs written by Nick Hexum
Songs written by Zack Hexum
Teen pop
Victoria Justice songs
Victorious